Alex Bogomolov Jr. won the first edition of the event by defeating Rik de Voest 6–3, 4–6, 7–6(7–2) in the final.

Seeds

Draw

Finals

Top half

Bottom half

References
 Main Draw
 Qualifying Draw

2013 Singles
Kunming Challengerandnbsp;- Singles